Andrew McDaniel (born January 22, 1984) is an American politician. He is a member of the Missouri House of Representatives from the 150th District, serving since 2015. He is a member of the Republican party.

References

Living people
1984 births
Republican Party members of the Missouri House of Representatives
21st-century American politicians